David Andrew Phoenix  (born 1966) is an English biochemist and Chief Executive of London South Bank University.

Early life
David Phoenix was born on 26 February 1966 in Lancashire, England. After attending Turton School in Bolton, he studied Biochemistry at Liverpool University and graduated BSc. He remained at Liverpool to complete his doctorate on penicillin binding proteins.

Career
After postdoctoral work in England and the Netherlands, Phoenix began work at the University of Central Lancashire where he became Deputy Vice-Chancellor before being appointed as Vice-Chancellor and Chief Executive of London South Bank University.

Academic background
Phoenix read biochemistry and obtained his BSc degree from the University of Liverpool followed by completion of a doctorate, in biochemistry. He continued to study part-time and obtained a Bachelor of Arts degree from the Open University in mathematics. Further study generated a master's degree in education and later a master's degree in business administration. His contribution to the field of biochemistry was rewarded by the presentation of the degree of Doctor of Science from Liverpool University. This higher doctorate recognised his work into the importance of amphiphilicity in the localisation and function of bioactive molecules.

He has published widely on the structure-function relationship of amphiphilic biomolecules, obtaining a Chair in Biochemistry in 2000. He has held Visiting Chairs in Russia, China, and Canada. In addition to peer-reviewed papers, edited collections and research monographs he has also been recognised for publication of undergraduate textbooks. And has been Editor in Chief for journals focused on education and for periodicals such as Biologist which are aimed at a broader readership.

Research

The group is multidisciplinary and draws on a range of specialities including, biology, chemistry, engineering,  physics and computational modelling to help develop understanding of the structure function relationships used by amphiphilic bioactive molecules. The term "peptide-amphiphile" can be used to describe amphiphilic peptides consisting only of amino acids that show segregation of charged and uncharged components within the primary or secondary structure. Alternatively, they may be composed of hydrophilic peptides linked to hydrophobic alkyl chains or lipids, and peptide-based copolymers. Such molecules are of significant biological importance due to the range of asymmetric boundaries that occur in nature such as those found at a membrane lipid interface. 

Amphiphilic protein sequences can be involved in protein targeting, membrane protein assembly as well as membrane fusion and lysis.  In addition to amphiphilic peptides possessing key biological functions amphiphiles are becoming of increasing interest in the creation of new biomaterials. Amphiphiles can self-assemble into a variety of different structures such as micelles, vesicles, monolayers, bilayers, nanofibers, nanotapes, ribbons, and twisted ribbons, to minimise unfavorable interactions with their surroundings.  A key aspect of his work involves the development of bioactive peptides and new biomaterials with biomedical application.

Significant awards

 2009 Awarded a D.Sc. by Liverpool University for his work in the field of Biochemistry.
 2010 Appointed Officer of the Order of the British Empire (OBE) in the 2010 Birthday Honours. for services to science and higher education.
 2012 Conferred the title of Academician by the Academy of Social Sciences in recognition of his work on science and education policy.
 2013 Awarded an Honorary Doctorate of the University of Bolton (DUniv) for his contribution to higher education, management and scholarship in the North West.
 2013 Elected as a non-medic to Fellowship of the Royal College of Physicians of Edinburgh for achieving considerable distinction in medical research and education.
 2014 Individual Excellence Award, Vice Premier Liu Yandong, China.
 2015 Deputy Lieutenant, DL, Greater London.
 2016 Fellow of Royal Society of Arts.
 2016 Appointed to Friendship Award (China)

Professional recognition
He was granted Chartered Chemist status by the Royal Society of Chemistry in the UK and later made a Fellow of the Society (FRSC). In addition, he was recognised as a Chartered Biologist and became a Fellow of the Institute of Biology, (FIBiol). He also became recognised as a Chartered Mathematician and later advanced to Fellowship of the Institute of Mathematics and its Applications. In 2007 he was recognised as a Fellow of the Royal Society of Medicine and is a Fellow of the Institution of Engineering and Technology. In 2008 his work in support of teaching was recognised by the award of a Senior Fellowship by the Higher Education Academy and later advanced to Principal Fellow

Career history
His PhD work engaged his interest in the role amphiphilicity plays in driving the interaction of bioactive molecules with cell membranes. He was awarded a long-term fellowship by the European Molecular Biology Organisation which enabled him to investigate the importance of amphiphilicity in protein translocation at Utrecht University Centre for Biomembranes and Lipid Enzymology. He continued to work on amphiphilic helices, being one of the first to help characterise their role as membrane protein anchors. He later expanded this work to investigate the importance of structure-function relationships in the design of antimicrobial peptides.

In 2000 he launched a new Department of Forensic and Investigative Science at the University of Central Lancashire and in 2002 he became Dean of Science and Technology when he launched a new School of Pharmacy.  During this time he also remained the UK representative on the European Committee of Biological Associations (ECBA) and for a while was a Commissioner for Biotechnology. He remains an international advisor on higher education and science to the University of Guyana.

In 2008 he became Deputy Vice-Chancellor with responsibility for strategic planning and performance across the University of Central Lancashire group. In 2010 he created UCLan Biomedical Technology Ltd, a research institute based in Shenzhen, China, which focuses on areas of nanoscience and nanoengineering. As the inaugural Chair he oversaw the development of research collaborations with key Chinese universities such as Fudan University and Sichuan University.  In 2012 he became Chair of UCLan Cyprus Ltd and provided the academic lead on the de novo creation of a private university in Larnaca, obtaining a licence to operate from the Ministry of Education with approval to initially run courses in business, languages, law, computing and mathematics.

In 2013 he was selected to replace Martin Earwicker upon his retirement as Vice-Chancellor and Chief Executive of London South Bank University. In 2014 he became Chair of MillionPlus, The Association for Modern Universities

Public service
He was appointed to an advisory committee for the appointment of Justice of the Peace by the Chancellor of the Duchy of Lancaster, a service which at the time came under the auspices of the Department for Constitutional Affairs. His work has tended to remain focused around the public understanding of science and education more broadly defined. He was appointed by the Department for Culture, Media and Sport as a Trustee for the Museum of Science and Industry in Manchester, and since 2018 has been its Chair as it transitioned to the Science and Industry Museum. 

In 2015 was appointed by the Prime Minister to the Board of the Science Museum Group, where he later became Vice-Chair. He has been a Trustee of both public and independent secondary schools and created  South Bank Academies Trust in South London leading it first as Chair then as a Director. In 2009 he was appointed as an Ambassador to the Government Equalities Office to support work focused on increasing diversity in public life.

References

External links
 University of Central Lancashire
 Higher Education Academy website
 UCLan Cyprus website
 Institute of Nanotechnology and Nanoengineering

1966 births
Living people
Scientists from Lancashire
Alumni of the Open University
Alumni of the University of Liverpool
Academics of the University of Central Lancashire
English biochemists
Computational chemists
Mathematics writers
English science writers
Officers of the Order of the British Empire
Fellows of the Academy of Social Sciences
Fellows of the Royal Society of Chemistry
Fellows of the Institute of Mathematics and its Applications
Vice-Chancellors of the University of Central Lancashire
Vice-Chancellors of London South Bank University
Deputy Lieutenants of Greater London